Pontllanfraith Rugby Football Club is a Welsh rugby union team based in Pontllanfraith. The club successfully gained membership to the Welsh Rugby Union in 1998. Today, Pontllanfraith RFC is a member of the Welsh Rugby Union and is a feeder club for the Newport Gwent Dragons.

Club honours

2005/06 WRU Division Four East - Champions

Notes

Welsh rugby union teams